National Airways may refer to:
 National Airways Cameroon, a defunct Cameroon airline
 National Airways Ethiopia, an airline having started its operations in 2007 in Ethiopia
 National Airways Gabon, an airline having started its operations in 2002 in Gabon
 National Airways Corporation (abbreviated NAC), and then to:
 National Airways Corporation (South Africa), a South African commercial aviation company
 New Zealand National Airways Corporation, a defunct New Zealand airline